Deathpunk may refer to:

 Deathrock, a rock music genre which emerged from punk rock
 Grindcore, a genre fusing hardcore punk with thrash metal and death metal 
 Deathcore, a genre fusing death metal with metalcore and/or hardcore punk
 The self-described style of Norwegian punk rock band Turbonegro
 Love It to Deathpunk, a compilation album released by Turbonegro in Australia

See also
 Death metal, death and roll